Petnja Lake is an artificial lake located  from the municipality of Sibinj (Završje) and  north-west of the city of Slavonski Brod, Croatia. It was created by the construction of a water dam in 1968, and through its existence has been excellently integrated into the environment. Today, it is an integral part of the area's ecosystem.

The lake is surrounded by an ancient Slavonian forest and is called "The eye of Dilj". There are also 3 caves in the area and numerous water sources. The water is supplied through fifteen springs, and the main water supply is the Petnja stream. 

It is an attraction for many nature lovers and hikers, and a great picnic destination. Being 8m deep and having over 20 different types of fish, it is also a popular destination for fishermen throughout the year.

References

 Photo gallery Petnja
 Jezero Petnja

Slavonia
Slavonski Brod
Lakes of Croatia
Artificial lakes
Landforms of Brod-Posavina County